Charles F. Fuller (born Charles F. Furrer; March 30, 1878 – March 1, 1937), was an American professional baseball player from 1900 to 1908. He played for the major league Brooklyn Superbas as a catcher in three games during the 1902 season. Fuller was one of several baseball players in the first half of the 20th century to be nicknamed "Nig".

Per his 1918 draft registration card, "Charles F. Furrer" (with a middle initial only) remained his legal name; the card listed his occupation as a railroad switchman, aged 40, married, and living in his hometown of Toledo, Ohio.

References

External links

1878 births
1937 deaths
Major League Baseball catchers
Brooklyn Superbas players
Baseball players from Ohio
Sportspeople from Toledo, Ohio
Minor league baseball managers
Terre Haute Hottentots players
Fort Wayne Railroaders players
Columbus Senators players
Montreal Royals players
Rochester Bronchos players
Toronto Maple Leafs (International League) players
Binghamton Bingoes players
Dayton Veterans players
Evansville River Rats players
Grand Rapids Wolverines players
Meridian Ribboners players